The Palazzo Taverna is a late Neoclassical mansion in Milan, Italy, designed by Ferdinando Albertolli in 1835. It is located at 2, Via Montenapoleone, in the Porta Nuova district of the city.

The building is notable in that it is reminiscent of Milan's Royal Villa and of country houses in general as the main body of the building is set back to form a courtyard next to the street. The entrance consists of an Ionic colonnade supporting a parapet. The two lateral sections have giant pilasters surmounted by triangular tympani.

Today the mansion houses a Louis Vuitton store.

See also
Neoclassical architecture in Milan

References

Houses completed in 1835
Neoclassical architecture in Milan
Palaces in Milan